Irula is a Dravidian language spoken by the Irulas who inhabit the area of the Nilgiri mountains, in the states of Tamil Nadu, Kerala, and Karnataka, India. It is closely related to Tamil. It is written in the Tamil script.

Origins 
The language was first described and classified by indologist Kamil Zvelebil, who in 1955 showed that the Irula language is an independent Southern Dravidian language that is akin to Tamil, particularly Old Tamil, with some Kannada-like features. Before that, it was traditionally denied or put to doubt, and Irula was described as a crude or corrupt mixture of Tamil and Kannada.

According to a tentative hypothesis by Kamil Zvelebil, a pre-Dravidian Melanid population that forms the bulk of the Irulas anthropologically began to speak an ancient pre- or proto-Tamil dialect, which was superimposed almost totally on their native (pre-Dravidian) speech. That then became the basis of the language, which must have subsequently been in close contact with the other tribal languages of the Nilgiri area as well as with the large surrounding languages such as Kannada, Tamil, and Malayalam.

Phonology 
The tables present the vowel and the consonant phonemes of Irula.

Vowels 

Zvelebil and Perialwar had listed centralized <ä, ǟ> before in the phonology. The real quality distinguishing <ä, ǟ> and <a, ā> isn't clear.

Consonants

References

Sources

Further reading 

Languages of Tamil Nadu
Tamil languages
Endangered languages of India